Pollicobius raymondi is a species of beetle in the family Carabidae, the only species in the genus Pollicobius.

References

Pterostichinae